Anthos or Antheus (Flower) is a play by the 5th century BCE Athenian dramatist Agathon.    The play has been lost.  The play is mentioned by Aristotle in his Poetics (1451b) as an example of a tragedy with a plot which gives pleasure despite the incidents and characters being entirely made up.  Anthos is the only known Greek tragedy play whose plot was entirely invented by the poet.  Other 5th century tragedies were based on myth, or less frequently on actual history.

References

Lost plays
Ancient Greek tragedies
5th-century BC plays